The 1956 USC Trojans football team represented the University of Southern California (USC) in the 1956 NCAA University Division football season. In their sixth and final year under head coach Jess Hill, the Trojans compiled an 8–2 record (5–2 against conference opponents), finished in a tie for second place in the Pacific Coast Conference, and outscored their opponents by a combined total of 218 to 126. The team was ranked #15 in the final United Press Coaches Poll and #18 in the final AP Poll. Total attendance for all 10 games was 469,762.

Frank Hall led the team in passing with 10 of 23 passes completed for 196 yards, two touchdowns and one interception. C. R. Roberts led the team in rushing with 120 carries for 775 yards and five touchdowns. Tony Ortega was the leading receiver with seven catches for 223 yards and one touchdown. Ernie Zampese rushed for 500 yards and passed for 166 yards.

Two Trojans received first-team honors from the Associated Press or the United Press (UP) on the 1956 All-Pacific Coast Conference football team: backs C. R. Roberts (AP-1; UP-1 [fullback]) and Jon Arnett, USC (UP-1 [halfback]).

Players
The following players were members of the 1956 USC football team.
 Fabian Abram, tackle, 6'3", 215 pounds, Redondo Beach, California
 Jon Arnett, senior HB (#26)
 George Belotti, tackle, 6'3", 253 pounds, Oxnard, California
 Ron Fletcher, tackle, 6'3", 215 pounds, Los Angeles
 Walt Gurasich, guard, 6'1", 219 pounds, Sherman Oaks, California
 Frank Hall, quarterback, 6'0", 175 pounds, San Francisco, California
 Mike Henry, tackle, 6'2", 212 pounds, Los Angeles
 Don Hickman, halfback, 5'10", 170 pounds, Monterey Park, California
 Hillard Hill, end, 6'1", 188 pounds, Pasadena, California
 Ells Kissinger, quarterback, 5'10, 183 pounds, York, Pennsylvania
 Ben Lardizabal, guard, 5'11", 210 pounds, Los Angeles
 Chuck Leimbach, end, 6'4", 193 pounds, Los Angeles
 C. R. Roberts, fullback, 6'1", 206 pounds, Oceanside, California
 Bob Rosendahl, end, 6'1", 178 pounds, Lynwood, California
 Karl Rubke, center, 6'4", 225 pounds, Lynwood, California
 Laird Willott, guard, 6'0", 205 pounds, Glendale, California
 Ernie Zampese, halfback, 5'9", 166 pounds, Santa Barbara, California

Schedule

Season summary

at Texas
C.R. Roberts 12 rushes, 251 yards

Coaching staff
 Head coach: Jess Hill
 Assistant coaches: Nick Pappas (back coach), Mel Hein (line coach), George Ceithaml (back coach), Bill Fisk (end coach), Joe Margucci (JV coach), Don Clark (line coach), Bob Titchenal (freshman)
 Senior football manager: Mike O'Dell

References

USC
USC Trojans football seasons
USC Trojans football